Vrdnik can refer to:

 Vrdnik-Ravanica Monastery, a monastery in Srem, Vojvodina, Serbia
 Vrdnik (village), a village in Srem, Vojvodina, Serbia
 Vrdnik Transcript, a copy of the Ravanica Charter